Ann Karindi Mwangi (born 8 December 1988) is a Kenyan middle- and long-distance runner. She was a team gold medallist at the IAAF World Cross Country Championships in 2009 and represented her country at the 2011 All-Africa Games.

From Nyahururu in Kenya's Laikipia County, She moved to Japan and ran for the Toyota Industries corporate team. She set a stage record at the 2010 All-Japan Women's Corporate Ekiden Championships.

Running for Kenya, she won her first major medal at the 2009 IAAF World Cross Country Championships. In seventh place, she took the women's team title with the help of Florence Kiplagat, Linet Masai and Lineth Chepkurui. She won the Cross Zornotza the following year and had her first top level road win in Japan at the Sanyo Women's 10K.

She began to focus more on middle-distance after 2009. She was sixth in the 1500 metres at both the 2010 African Championships in Athletics and the 2011 All-Africa Games. She helped set a world record in the 4 × 1500 metres relay event. Running in a team with Mercy Cherono, Irene Jelagat, and Perin Nenkampi, the women took two seconds off the previous best at 17:05.72 minutes.

Personal bests
800 metres – 2:04.69 min (2015)
1500 metres – 4:05.23 min (2014)
3000 metres – 8:43.54 min (2009)
5000 metres – 15:15.19 min (2010)
10K run – 32:47 min (2011)

All information from All-Athletics profile

International competitions

References

External links

1988 births
Living people
People from Laikipia County
Kenyan female middle-distance runners
Kenyan female long-distance runners
World record setters in athletics (track and field)
Athletes (track and field) at the 2011 All-Africa Games
Kenyan female cross country runners
Kenyan expatriate sportspeople in Japan
African Games competitors for Kenya